India's golden triangle is a tourist circuit in India that connects the national capital, New Delhi, Agra and Jaipur. The Golden Triangle is so named because of the triangular shape formed by the locations of Delhi, Uttar Pradesh and Rajasthan on a map. The trips usually start in Delhi and move south to the site of the Taj Mahal at Agra, then west, to the desert landscapes of Rajasthan. It is normally possible to do the trip by coach or private journey through most tour operators. The Golden Triangle is now a well-traveled route, providing a good spectrum of the country's different landscapes. The circuit is about 720 km by road. Each leg is about 4 to 6 hours of driving. The Shatabdi express train also connects New Delhi with Agra and Jaipur.

Records
In 2018 Zainul Abideen ran the Golden Triangle on foot to raise awareness about acid/rape attacks in India.

References

Traversing the Golden Triangle. Incredible India.

Tourism in India
Tourism in Rajasthan
Tourism in Delhi
Tourism in Uttar Pradesh
Tourist attractions in Agra
Tourism in Odisha